Donacaula hasegawai is a moth in the family Crambidae. It was described by Shibuya in 1927. It is found in Korea.

References

Moths described in 1927
Schoenobiinae